Stuart Harold Comberbach (born 27 September 1952) is a Zimbabwean diplomat and politician. Currently, he serves as Ambassador/Permanent Representative of Zimbabwe to the United Nations and other international organisations in Geneva, Switzerland.

Immediately prior to that, he served as a Special Advisor to the Minister of Foreign Affairs and International Trade of Zimbabwe, Lieutenant General (Rtd) Dr Sibusiso B. Moyo.

He served previously as Zimbabwe's Ambassador to Italy from 1994 to 1999, and later Ambassador to Japan and South Korea from 2003 to 2014, in 2014 Comberbach was named a senior advisor in the Office the President and Cabinet under former President Robert Mugabe. Born in Salisbury (today Harare), Comberbach joined the Rhodesian civil service in 1974 and is one of the few white civil servants remaining in Zimbabwe.

Early life and education 
Comberbach was born on 27 September 1952 in Salisbury, Southern Rhodesia (today Harare, Zimbabwe). He attended the University of the Witwatersrand in Johannesburg, South Africa, graduating in 1974.

Civil service career 
After graduating from Wits University in 1974, Comberbach returned to Rhodesia and joined the civil service the same year. He worked under the Ministry of Foreign Affairs, serving in Gabon from 1974 to 1979. From 1987 to 1994, he was the head of the Zimbabwe Trade Mission in Johannesburg, South Africa. From 1994 to 1999, he served as Zimbabwe's Ambassador to Italy and the Permanent Representative of Zimbabwe to the United Nations' Food and Agricultural Organization. In Rome, he served on the UN Committee on World Food Security. He was Permanent Secretary for the Ministry of Industry and International Trade from 1999 to 2002. He offered to resign from the civil service in 2001 when he made it clear that he opposed government price control policies that he believed would destroy the Zimbabwean economy. When Minister of Industry and International Trade Nkosana Moyo resigned unexpectedly in May 2001, Comberbach took over as temporary head of the ministry. At the time, a communication from the US Embassy in Harare described Comberbach as "one of the few senior whites remaining in government" and "a competent technocrat." The report noted his close relationship to leading ZANU–PF politician Nathan Shamuyarira, but described him as a "political lightweight."

From 2003 to 2014, Comberbach served as the Ambassador of Zimbabwe to Japan and South Korea. He also served as Chairman of the African Diplomatic Corps in Japan, an arm of the Tokyo International Conference on African Development (TICAD) from January 2003 and May 2011. On 8 May 2015, Comberbach was honoured with the Order of the Rising Sun, along with 5 other foreign recipients at an event held in Tokyo. Later, a conferment ceremony was held in Harare, hosted by Japan's Ambassador to Zimbabwe, Yoshi Hiraishi. Minister of Welfare Services for War Veterans Christopher Mutsvangwa praised Comberbach for receiving the honour. In 2015, Comberbach's successor as Ambassador to Japan, Air Vice-Marshal Titus Abu-Basutu.

In September 2014, President Robert Mugabe appointed Comberbach as Senior Secretary in the Office of the President and Cabinet. His appointment was announced by Mesheck Sibanda, Chief Secretary to the President and Cabinet. At the time, it was reported that he was one of the last white civil servants left in Zimbabwe. He was later assigned different areas of focus within the office of the President and Cabinet: in 2015, he became the Permanent Secretary for Corporate Governance, State Enterprises, and Delivery Unit. In September 2018, President Emmerson Mnangagwa appointed new advisors, and Comberbach was assigned the new portfolio of Special Advisor to the Minister of Foreign Affairs and International Trade.

Personal life 
Comberbach's wife is Benedict Ann "Dicky" Comberbach. They have children.

Foreign honours 

 Japan: Order of the Rising Sun (2015)

References 

Living people
1952 births
20th-century diplomats
21st-century diplomats
Ambassadors of Zimbabwe to Italy
Ambassadors of Zimbabwe to Japan
Ambassadors of Zimbabwe to South Korea
Government advisors
People from Harare
Presidential advisors
Recipients of the Order of the Rising Sun
Representatives of Zimbabwe to the Food and Agriculture Organization
University of the Witwatersrand alumni
White Rhodesian people
White Zimbabwean politicians
Zimbabwean diplomats